Linda Rombouts (born 22 July 1953) is a Belgian speed skater. She competed in three events at the 1976 Winter Olympics.

References

1953 births
Living people
Belgian female speed skaters
Olympic speed skaters of Belgium
Speed skaters at the 1976 Winter Olympics
Sportspeople from Antwerp
20th-century Belgian women